Chou Ching-chun (28 June 1943 – 16 June 2021) was a Taiwanese social activist and politician.

Biography
Chou was president of the Patriot Alliance Association (PAA) since 2018.

Chou died at the Taipei City Hospital Zhongxing Branch on 16 June 2021, aged 77, from COVID-19. His wife Lin Ming-mei was charged with violations of the Anti-Infiltration Act in July 2022, following an investigation into the PAA led by the Taipei District Prosecutors’ Office. Prosecutors stated that Chou would not be posthumously indicted.

References

21st-century Taiwanese politicians
1943 births
2021 deaths
Place of birth missing
Politicians from Taipei
Deaths from the COVID-19 pandemic in Taiwan
Taiwanese activists